The following lists events that have happened in 1848 in the Qajar dynasty.

Incumbents
 Monarch: Mohammad Shah Qajar (until September 5), Naser al-Din Shah Qajar (starting September 5)

Events
 September 17 – Nasser al-Din Shah Qajar ascended to throne.

Death
 September 5 – Mohammad Shah Qajar died in Tehran, Iran.

References

 
Iran
Years of the 19th century in Iran
1840s in Iran